Miller Gore Brittain (November 12, 1912 – January 21, 1968) was a Canadian artist from Saint John, New Brunswick.

Early life
Brittain was born and raised in Saint John. He studied art with Elizabeth Russell Holt in Saint John and under Harry Wickey in New York City. In 1932, after living in New York, he returned to Saint John, where he worked at clerical and construction jobs and opened an art studio on the waterfront. During this period, he captured realistic scenes of everyday life in the city which incorporated social commentary. During the 1930s, he joined the Oxford Group, a Christian organization.

Life in Saint John

After studying in New York, Brittain felt he didn't have to leave the region to make a career as an artist. However, at the time Saint John was still recovering from three major fires and was in the middle of the Depression. As a young man he worked as a draftsman and worked on the docks while working on his craft amongst a thriving arts community including Ruth Starr, Ted Campbell, Fred Ross and Jack Humphrey. In January 1949, his first major exhibit was held at the New Brunswick Museum in Saint John. The exhibition was so popular he went on to do a series of solo shows in New York.

Brittain was an icon of the Saint John arts community and presence is still felt in the city's arts scene today. The popular Britt's Pub, named for the artist, is on the ground floor of his studio at 42 Princess St.

Career
Brittain is considered one of Canada's most prolific painters. His work broke from the style current at the time of the Group of Seven when landscapes dominated Canada's art scene. Brittain focused on working class life in his hometown of Saint John with his signature style of social realism. He was a founding member of the Federation of Canadian Artists in 1941.

In the early 1940s, Brittain joined the Royal Canadian Air Force (RCAF) and was posted to the 78th Squadron of the R.A.F. Bomber Command, as a bomb-aimer. He was commissioned in November 1944 and was awarded the Distinguished Flying Cross. In 1945, he was appointed an official Second World War artist. One of his works, Night Target, Germany (1946), depicts a bombing raid over Germany.

After the war, his paintings took on a more surreal aspect, taking as their subject biblical topics, abstract figures, nudes and flowers. In 1947, Brittain won a prize from the Canadian Society of Graphic Art and the next year he held two one-person shows at St. John in the New Brunswick Museum and in Dayton, Ohio, at the Dayton Museum.

He married Connie Starr in 1951; he was devastated by her death from cancer seven years later and was treated several times for alcoholism in his later life. He died of a stroke in 1968 at the age of 55. In 1968, Brittain was awarded the Canadian Centennial Medal posthumously for his contribution to Canadian art.

Posthumous reputation
Brittain's work is held in private collections and a number of art galleries in Canada including the Beaverbrook Art Gallery, the National Gallery of Canada and the Canadian War Museum and a retrospective of his work has been held at the Art Gallery of Nova Scotia (2007) which travelled to the McMichael Canadian Art Collection.

The National Film Board of Canada produced a film based on his life in 1981. The film was awarded Best Overall Entry at the Atlantic Film Festival in 1982.

Record sale price 
In January 2022 his 1964 painting Figures on a Beach sold for $330,000 CAD in an online auction held by Liz Isaac & Citadel Gallery Auctions owned by Mario Brideau and Liz Isaac of Saint John. This was a record sale price for an oil painting by Brittain. The work was part of the estate of Brittain's daughter Jennifer.

See also
 Canadian official war artists
 War artist
 Military art

Notes

Further reading

External links 
 
War Art in Canada: A Critical History by Laura Brandon, published by the Art Canada Institute

1912 births
1968 deaths
20th-century Canadian painters
Canadian male painters
Artists from Saint John, New Brunswick
Canadian war artists
World War II artists
Canadian expatriates in the United States
20th-century Canadian male artists